Muhammad Ilyas (born in Kraksaan, Probolinggo, East Java, Indonesia on November 23, 1911 - died in Jakarta, Indonesia on December 5, 1970 at the age of 59 years) was the Minister of Religious Affairs in 1955-1959 in the Burhanuddin Harahap Cabinet, Second Ali Sastroamidjojo Cabinet, and the Djuanda Cabinet in the reign of the first Indonesian president Sukarno. He also served as Indonesian ambassador to Saudi Arabia for six years, from 1959.

KH Muhammad Ilyas is the law of Muhammad Maftuh Basyuni, Minister of Religious Affairs in the United Indonesia Cabinet 2004-2009.

In 1969, he led the Indonesian delegation following the Summit (Summit), which was attended by 26 Islamic countries in Rabat, Morocco which discussed the Palestine-Israel conflict.

References 

Indonesian diplomats
Government ministers of Indonesia
People from Probolinggo
Politicians from East Java
1911 births
1970 deaths
Javanese people